Julen Guerrero Calvo (born March 27, 1996, Castro Urdiales, Spain) is a Spanish film, theater and television actor and stage director.

Life and career 

He was born in Castro Urdiales in 1996. From a young age he was attached to the theater, participating in different plays.

He trained in performing arts and acting at the Ánima Eskola School of Drama, training as a method actress, under the Stanislavsky-M.Chekhov-Grotowski-Vakhtangov methodology (Russian method), following the methodologies of the Russian classical school. There he coincided with the also actresses Carmen Climent and Nerea Elizalde, together with whom he was trained. Later, he graduated in theater at the Higher School of Dramatic Art of Castilla y León (ESADCyL) of Castile and Leon (in Valladolid), specializing in stage direction and dramaturgy. Afterwards, he studied a master's degree in contemporary thought and scenic creation also at the Higher School of Dramatic Art of Castilla y León (ESADCyL).

In 2014 he performed the play A Midsummer Night's Dream by William Shakespeare, playing the role of Theseus, a theatrical production at the Campos Elíseos Theatre, directed by Spanish stage director David Valdelvira, together with Carmen Climent and Nerea Elizalde, among other cast members. The stage production was awarded the Buero Vallejo Award (2015), in the XII edition of the awards.

In 2017 he participated in the play Fuegos (Fires), written by Lola Blasco. The play won the "Best Show" award at the Valladolid International Festival. In 2019, he directed the play Yo, eromeno, a play about two men who maintain a relationship, with the collaboration of playwright and stage director José Manuel Mora Ortiz. The work won the second prize at the Youth Art Contest of the Youth Institute of Castile and Leon.

In 2019 he participated in the work The Seagull (by Chekhov). The performance was selected to be performed in Saint Petersburg (Russia), in an international theater festival, in which several plays from different countries are selected to be performed for two weeks at the festival.

During the years 2019 and 2020 he was selected as an assistant director in two large theatrical productions. The first, Yerma (by Lorca), directed by Pepa Gamboa and starring María León. The second, In the words of Jo... Little Women, based on the novel Little Women.

Filmography

Television 
 2020, The Heritage Project, International Media Ministries

Stage

Awards and nominations

Buero Vallejo Awards

References 

1996 births
Living people
21st-century Spanish actors
Spanish film actors
Spanish television actors
Spanish stage actors
Ánima Eskola School of Drama alumni